The 2012 I-League 2nd Division Final Round will be the fifth Final Round of the I-League 2nd Division. The tournament began, after the group stage was completed, on 5 March 2012.

Format
The Final Round of the 2012 I-League 2nd Division will take place between six teams from the group stage and a seventh club, ONGC who were relegated from the 2010-11 I-League season, in a single table format in which each team plays each other twice, once in Siliguri and once in Gangtok. The top two teams at the end of the Final Round were promoted to the 2012–13 I-League replacing the two last place teams in the 2011–12 I-League.

Qualification
The top two clubs from each group, based on final point totals, qualified for the Final Round. Mohammedan were the first club to qualify for the Final Round.

Group A

Group B

Group C

Final Round Table

Fixtures and Results
The All India Football Federation released the schedule for the Siliguri and Gangtok phase of the Final Round on 24 February 2012.

Siliguri Phase

Match Day 1 
Monday, 5 March 2012

Tuesday, 6 March 2012

Match Day 2 
Thursday, 8 March 2012

Saturday, 10 March 2012

Match Day 3 
Monday, 12 March 2012

Tuesday, 13 March 2012

Match Day 4 
Thursday, 15 March 2012

Friday, 16 March 2012

Match Day 5 
Sunday, 18 March 2012

 

Monday, 19 March 2012

Match Day 6 
Wednesday, 21 March 2012

Thursday, 22 March 2012

Match Day 7 
Saturday, 24 March 2012

Sunday, 25 March 2012

Gangtok Phase

Match Day 8 
Thursday, 29 March 2012

Friday, 30 March 2012

Match Day 9 
Sunday, 1 April 2012

Monday, 2 April 2012

Match Day 10 
Wednesday, 4 April 2012

Thursday, 5 April 2012

Match Day 11 
Saturday, 7 April 2012

Sunday, 8 April 2012

Match Day 12 
Tuesday, 10 April 2012

Wednesday, 11 April 2012

Match Day 13 
Friday, 13 April 2012

Saturday, 14 April 2012

Match Day 14 
Monday, 16 April 2012

Tuesday, 17 April 2012

Top scorers
Note: These stats are only for the Final Round, the Group Stage goals don't carry over to this stage.

References

I-League 2nd Division final rounds